The End Is Known is a 1992 Italian-French mystery film directed by Cristina Comencini. It is an adaptation of the novel with the same name by Geoffrey Holiday Hall, in which the setting is moved from post-war America to 1980s' Italy.

Cast 
Fabrizio Bentivoglio as Lawyer Bernardo Manni
Valérie Kaprisky as Maria Manni
Carlo Cecchi as "Cervello" (the brain) 
Mariangela Melato as Elena Malva
Valeria Moriconi as Elvira Delogu
Massimo Wertmüller as Carlo Piane
Corso Salani as Rosario
Daria Nicolodi as Lawyer Mila
Valeria Milillo as Archivista 
Stefano Viali as Lawyer Anselmi
Marina Perzy as Miss Gerli

References

External links

1992 films
Italian mystery films
Films directed by Cristina Comencini
1990s mystery films
French mystery films
Films scored by Fiorenzo Carpi
1990s Italian-language films
1990s French films
1990s Italian films